Callisia is a genus of flowering plants in the spiderwort family, Commelinaceae. Members of the genus are commonly known as roselings. It is native to the Western Hemisphere from the southern United States to Argentina. The generic name is derived from the Greek word κάλλος (kallos), meaning "beauty."

Some members of Callisia may cause allergic reactions in pets (especially cats and dogs), characterised by red, itchy skin.  Notable culprits are C. fragrans (inch plant) and C. repens (turtle vine).

Species 
Callisia includes the following species:
 Callisia ciliata Kunth – Panama, Colombia
 Callisia cordifolia (Sw.) E.S.Anderson & Woodson – Florida Roseling – Central America, tropical Mexico, Cuba, Jamaica, Venezuela, Colombia, Ecuador, Peru, Florida, Georgia
 Callisia filiformis (M.Martens & Galeotti) D.R.Hunt – central + southern Mexico, Central America, Lesser Antilles, Venezuela, northeastern Brazil
 Callisia fragrans (Lindl.) Woodson – Mexico; naturalized in Florida, Louisiana, Hawaii, West Indies, Morocco, Taiwan, Norfolk Island in Australia
 Callisia gentlei Matuda – southern Mexico, Guatemala, Honduras
 Callisia graminea (Small) G.Tucker – Grassleaf roseling – southeastern United States from Florida to Virginia
 Callisia hintoniorum B.L.Turner – Nuevo León
 Callisia insignis C.B.Clarke  – Mexico; naturalized in Venezuela
 Callisia laui (D.R.Hunt) D.R.Hunt – Guerrero, Oaxaca
 Callisia micrantha (Torr.) D.R.Hunt – Littleflower roseling – Texas, Tamaulipas
 Callisia monandra (Sw.) J.A.Schultes & J.H.Schultes – Cojite morado – widespread from northern Mexico + West Indies to Argentina
 Callisia multiflora (M.Martens & Galeotti) Standl. – central + southern Mexico, Central America
 Callisia navicularis (Ortgies) D.R.Hunt – Nuevo León, Veracruz, Tamaulipas, Puebla, San Luis Potosí
 Callisia ornata (Small) G.Tucker – Florida scrub roseling – Georgia, Florida
 Callisia repens (Jacq.) L. – Creeping inchplant – scattered locales in southern United States (Riverside County in California, Texas, Louisiana, Florida); widespread from Mexico + West Indies south to Argentina
 Callisia rosea (Vent.) D.R.Hunt – Piedmont roseling – southeastern United States from Alabama to Maryland
 Callisia soconuscensis Matuda – Guatemala, southern Mexico
 Callisia tehuantepecana Matuda – Oaxaca
 Callisia warszewicziana (Kunth & C.D.Bouché) D.R.Hunt – Veracruz, Chiapas, Guatemala

Formerly placed here 

 Neodonnellia grandiflora (Donn.Sm.) Rose  (as C. grandiflora Donn.Sm.)

References

External links 

 
Commelinales genera